Mahmat Adoum is a former Chadian professional football player. He made one appearance for the Chad national football team.

See also
 List of Chad international footballers

References

External links
 

Year of birth missing (living people)
Living people
Chadian footballers
Chad international footballers
Place of birth missing (living people)
Association footballers not categorized by position